The National Semiconductor COP8 is an 8-bit CISC core microcontroller. COP8 is an enhancement to the earlier COP400 4-bit microcontroller family. COP8 main features are:

 Large amount of I/O pins
 Up to 32 KB of Flash memory/ROM for code and data 
 Very low EMI (no known bugs)
 Many integrated peripherals (meant as single chip design)
 In-System Programming
 Free assembler toolchain. Commercial C compilers available
 Free Multitasking OS and TCP/IP stack

It has a machine cycle of up to 2M cycles per second, but most versions seem to be overclockable to up to 2.8M cycles per second (28 MHz clock).

Registers and memory map
The COP8 uses separate instruction and data spaces (Harvard architecture).  Instruction address space is 15-bit (32 KiB maximum), while data addresses are 8-bit (256 bytes maximum, extended via bank-switching).

To allow software bugs to be caught, all invalid instruction addresses read as zero, which is a trap instruction.  Invalid RAM above the stack reads as all-ones, which is an invalid address.

The CPU has an 8-bit accumulator and 15-bit program counter.  16 additional 8-bit registers (R0–R15) and an 8-bit program status word are memory mapped.  There are special instructions to access them, but general RAM access instructions may also be used.

The memory map is divided into half RAM and half control registers as follows:

If RAM is not banked, then R15 (S) is just another general-purpose register.  If RAM is banked, then the low half of the data address space (addresses 0x00–7F) is directed to a RAM bank selected by S.  The special purpose registers in the high half of the data address space are always visible.  The data registers at 0xFx can be used to copy data between banks.

RAM banks other than bank 0 have all 128 bytes available.  The stack (addressed via the stack pointer) is always on bank 0, no matter how the S register is set.

Control transfers
In addition to 3-byte  and  instructions which can address the entire address space, 2-byte versions of these instructions can jump within a 4K page.  The instruction specifies the low 12 bits, and the high 3 bits of the PC are preserved.  (These are intended primarily for models with up to 4K of ROM.)

There are also jump indirect and load accumulator indirect instructions which use the accumulator contents as the low 8 bits of an address; the high 7 bits of the current PC are preserved.

For short-distance branches, there are 63 1-byte instructions which perform PC-relative branches from PC−32 to PC+31.  This is a 15-bit addition, and no page boundary requirements apply.

Conditional branches per se do not exist, nor does the processor provide the traditional ZCVN status flags, although the program status word contains carry and half-carry flags for multi-byte arithmetic.  Rather, there are a number of compare-and-skip instructions.  For example,  compares its two operands, and skips the following instruction if they are unequal.  Any instruction may be skipped; it is not limited to branches.

A feature unique to the COP8 architecture is the  instruction.  This compares the low 4 bits of the B (memory pointer) register with a 4-bit immediate constant, and can be used to loop until B has reaches the end of a small (up to 16 byte) buffer.

An interesting extension of this mechanism is the  return-and-skip instruction, which lets any subroutine call conditionally skip the following instruction.  This provides a very compact way to return a boolean value from a subroutine.

Instruction set 
COP8 operands are listed in destination, source order. Most instructions have the accumulator A as one of the operands. Some instructions also support RAM addressing by the X register, and post-inc/decrement variants.

Indirect addressing via B is particularly fast, and can be done in the same cycle that the instruction is executed.

On the other hand, absolute RAM addressing is not directly encoded in most cases.  Rather, a special "direct addressing" prefix opcode, followed by a 1-byte address, may precede any instruction with a  operand, and changes it to a memory direct operand.  This adds two bytes and three cycles to the instruction.  (Conditional-skip instructions skip the prefix and following instruction as a pair.)

All "move" instructions are called  (load) even if the destination is a memory address.  Unusually, there are no  instructions with the accumulator as a source; stores are done with the  instruction which exchanges the accumulator with the memory operand, storing A and loading the previous memory contents.  (This takes no additional time;  is a one-cycle instruction.)

There are instructions to fetch from tables in ROM.  These combine the high 7 bits of the program counter (PCU) with the accumulator, fetch a byte from that address, and place it in the accumulator ( instruction) or the low 8 bits of the program counter PCL ( instruction).  Because the next instruction executed must be in the same 256-byte page of ROM as the table itself, a 256-entry table is not possible.

*: Only on "feature family" (COP888/COP8SA) cores; not present on "basic family" (COP800) cores.
†: Only on "flash family" (COP8TA/COP8C) models with boot ROM for in-system programming

References

External links
 National Semiconductor Embedded Microcontrollers (CR16 and COP8)
 microcontroller-faq/COP8, 1995
 

Microcontrollers